In automata theory, the class of unrestricted grammars (also called semi-Thue, type-0 or phrase structure grammars) is the most general class of grammars in the Chomsky hierarchy. No restrictions are made on the productions of an unrestricted grammar, other than each of their left-hand sides being non-empty. This grammar class can generate arbitrary recursively enumerable languages.

Formal definition 

An unrestricted grammar is a formal grammar , where

  is a finite set of nonterminal symbols,

  is a specially designated start symbol. 

As the name implies, there are no real restrictions on the types of production rules that unrestricted grammars can have.

Equivalence to Turing machines 

The unrestricted grammars characterize the recursively enumerable languages. This is the same as saying that for every unrestricted grammar  there exists some Turing machine capable of recognizing  and vice versa. Given an unrestricted grammar, such a Turing machine is simple enough to construct, as a two-tape nondeterministic Turing machine. The Turing machine then does the following:

 Start at the left of the second tape and repeatedly choose to move right or select the current position on the tape.
 Compare the resulting sentential form on tape 2 to the word on tape 1.  If they match, then the Turing machine accepts the word.  If they don't, the Turing machine will go back to step 1.

The reverse construction is also possible.  Given some Turing machine, it is possible to create an equivalent unrestricted grammar which even uses only productions with one or more non-terminal symbols on their left-hand sides. Therefore, an arbitrary unrestricted grammar can always be equivalently converted to obey the latter form, by converting it to a Turing machine and back again. Some authors use the latter form as definition of unrestricted grammar.

Computational properties 

The decision problem of whether a given string  can be generated by a given unrestricted grammar is equivalent to the problem of whether it can be accepted by the Turing machine equivalent to the grammar. The latter problem is called the Halting problem and is undecidable.

Recursively enumerable languages are closed under Kleene star, concatenation, union, and intersection, but not under set difference; see Recursively enumerable language#Closure properties.

The equivalence of unrestricted grammars to Turing machines implies the existence of a universal unrestricted grammar, a grammar capable of accepting any other unrestricted grammar's language given a description of the language. For this reason, it is theoretically possible to build a programming language based on unrestricted grammars (e.g. Thue).

See also
 Lambda calculus
 Semi-Thue system — doesn't distinguish terminal and nonterminal symbols, admits empty left-hand sides

Notes

References

Formal languages